The Billions of Arsène Lupin is a detective novel by Maurice Leblanc about gentleman thief Arsène Lupin.  The novel appeared in 29 daily serials, illustrated by Jean Oberle in Auto from 10 January to 11 February 1939, then published in volume 16 in Hachette (Collection "The Enigma" No. 13) in November 1941, with illustrations by André Pécoud.

The Hachette edition of 1941, a story that has not been written, in fact, beyond 1939, is the only edition in 1987 before insertion of this ultimate story of Arsène Lupin in the collection of Francis Lacassin (Volume 4, published in 1987). Thus, there are two posthumous editions. It is likely that illness and death had prevented the author of completing this novel; the family has refused for 46 years to a second issue, to respect the memory of the novelist. "If not adhere to this rule is to avoid compromising the completeness of our edition" 2.

The Hachette edition 1941 is incomplete: one of the 29 operas "L'Auto", n ° 23 of February 3, 1939, was omitted by mistake. Error repeated in the reissue Robert Laffont 1987: Volume 4 of "Mouthpieces" collection is similarly amputated.

Summary

Patricia, a young American assistant James Allermy Mac is very popular with her boss. The latter, based in the United States, is founder of "Hello-Police", a tabloid that chronicles crime, and plans for his invaluable secretary a great professional future. He is aware that the pretty woman was seduced and abandoned, to his great regret, by his own son, who finally made a marriage more in line with his fortune. As a result of this connection, Patricia found herself a single mother, but the presence of Rudolph, a young child, gives her the courage to face life. Another event, however, is about to give another twist to her life.

One evening, on the premises of the company itself, she is attacked by an individual called "The Rough." She is saved in extremis by a man of strength and reassuring impassivity she does not know , but whom the bandit, astonished at his prowess, asks to her surprise: "Would you happen to be Arsene Lupin by chance? "

Why was the famous gentleman thief in America? Why, after a mysterious nocturnal meeting of eleven men, were Mac Allermy and his attorney murdered with knife in the heart? What's in the brown leather briefcase stolen from Mac Allermy the night of his death, and now owned by "The Rough", who speaks of an immense fortune?

Fortune! The magic word to make appear--and disappear--Lupin. Patricia instinctively departs for France (the boat trip will be hectic) because it was the intended destination of her late boss, whom she now wishes to avenge. It is also the stomping ground of an agent well armed to handle such a complicated and dangerous line of business, and who gave her at their first meeting, a silver whistle: "In case of danger, whistle without stopping. I will come ... "

References

↑ Volume 4 de la Collection « Arsène Lupin » de Francis Lacassin (Bouquins, 1986).
↑ Francis Lacassin, note d'édition

External links
 

Arsène Lupin novels
1939 French novels
Novels first published in serial form
Hachette (publisher) books